Inada Dam  is an earthfill dam located in Hokkaido Prefecture in Japan. The dam is used for irrigation. The catchment area of the dam is 13 km2. The dam impounds about 7  ha of land when full and can store 410 thousand cubic meters of water. The construction of the dam was completed in 1979.

References

Dams in Hokkaido